Sonny Red is an album by American saxophonist Sonny Red recorded in 1971 and released on the Mainstream label.

Reception
The Allmusic review awarded the album 4 stars stating simply "Early-'70s recording with Cedar Walton".

Track listing
All compositions by Sonny Red except as indicated
 "Love Song" - 5:48   
 "Tears" - 7:19   
 "Mustang" - 5:49   
 "And Then Again" (Elvin Jones) - 4:14   
 "My Romance" (Lorenz Hart, Richard Rodgers) - 4:44   
 "A Time for Love" (Johnny Mandel, Paul Francis Webster) - 5:19   
 "Rodan" - 4:36

Personnel
Sonny Red - flute, alto saxophone, tenor saxophone
Cedar Walton - piano
Herbie Lewis - bass
Billy Higgins - drums, congas

References

Mainstream Records albums
Sonny Red albums
1971 albums
Albums produced by Bob Shad